Campiglossa venezolensis is a species of tephritid or fruit flies in the genus Campiglossa of the family Tephritidae.

Distribution
The species is found in Venezuela.

References

Tephritinae
Insects described in 1939
Diptera of South America